André Mathilde Édouard Parengh (12 November 1926 – 2 September 2011), better known under the pseudonym Tony Corsari, was a Belgian TV show host and presenter. He also scored a few minor hits as a singer. He was the host of the popular Flemish TV quiz show  100.000 of niets from 1956 until 1959.

He was born in Tienen and died of cancer in Ghent.

Notes

1926 births
2011 deaths
Belgian game show hosts
Belgian cartoonists
Belgian humorists
People from Tienen
Deaths from cancer in Belgium